Miroslav "Mića" Berić (born January 20, 1973) is a Serbian former professional basketball player. Standing at 2.00 m (6'6 ") tall, he played at the shooting guard position.

Professional career
Berić was the top scorer of the 2000–01 FIBA SuproLeague, averaging 23.3 points per game, while playing with Partizan. He also played for Tau Vitoria, Müller Verona, Scavolini Pesaro, Žalgiris, Panellinios, Azovmash, Llanera Menorca and Gijón.

After being without a club for more than a year, Berić announced his retirement from basketball in June 2008.

Yugoslav national team
Berić was a regular member of the senior Yugoslav national team, during the 1990s. He won two FIBA EuroBasket gold medals, in 1995 and 1997, as well as the gold medal at the 1998 FIBA World Championship.

Career statistics

EuroLeague

|-
| style="text-align:left;"| 2001–02
| style="text-align:left;"| Pesaro
| 16 || 11 || 28.6 || .397 || .387 || .807 || 1.6 || 1.9 || .6 || .0 || 13.0 || 10.6
|-
| style="text-align:left;"| 2003–04
| style="text-align:left;"| Žalgiris
| 9 || 5 || 23.6 || .500 || .419 || .625 || 1.3 || 1.7 || .3 || .0 || 9.8 || 6.6
|- class="sortbottom"
| style="text-align:left;"| Career
| style="text-align:left;"|
| 25 || 16 || 26.8 || .428 || .396 || .766 || 1.5 || 1.8 || .5 || .0 || 11.8 || 9.2

Post-playing career
Soon after his retirement, in July 2008, Berić was hired as the team manager of the senior Serbian national team. The hiring took place at the invitation of the team's head coach Dušan Ivković.

He quit the job in 2011.

See also 
List of Olympic medalists in basketball

External links
 Miroslav Berić at fiba.com
 Miroslav Berić at fibaeurope.com
 Miroslav Berić at euroleague.net
 Miroslav Berić at acb.com 
 Miroslav Berić at legabasket.it 

1973 births
Living people
Basketball players at the 1996 Summer Olympics
BC Azovmash players
BC Žalgiris players
FIBA EuroBasket-winning players
Gijón Baloncesto players
KK Partizan players
Liga ACB players
Medalists at the 1996 Summer Olympics
Menorca Bàsquet players
Olympic basketball players of Yugoslavia
Olympic medalists in basketball
Olympic silver medalists for Serbia and Montenegro
Panellinios B.C. players
Saski Baskonia players
Scaligera Basket Verona players
Serbian expatriate basketball people in Greece
Serbian expatriate basketball people in Italy
Serbian expatriate basketball people in Lithuania
Serbian expatriate basketball people in Spain
Serbian expatriate basketball people in Ukraine
Serbian men's basketball players
Shooting guards
Basketball players from Belgrade
Victoria Libertas Pallacanestro players
FIBA World Championship-winning players
1998 FIBA World Championship players